Pea Patch Island is a small island, approximately 1 mi (1.6 km) long, in the U.S. state of Delaware, located in the mid channel of the Delaware River near its entrance into Delaware Bay. It is a low, marshy island, located in New Castle County, facing Delaware City on the Delaware shore, and Finns Point on the New Jersey shore. Once the location of strategic military defenses, the island is currently owned by the State of Delaware as Fort Delaware State Park.

The island emerged as a mud bank in the river in the 18th century. According to folklore, the island received its name after a ship full of peas ran aground on it, spilling its contents and leading to a growth of the plant on the island. In the 1790s, Pierre L'Enfant suggested the use of the island as part of the defenses of New Castle, Delaware and Philadelphia. During the War of 1812, a seawall and dykes were built on the island, with a view to building a Martello tower there. By 1814, the island had been sufficiently developed for the construction of the first Fort Delaware. A five-pointed star fort was built 1815–1824. However, this fort was wrecked by a fire in 1831. Construction began on a much larger polygonal fort in 1836, but this project was derailed by a decade-long legal battle over which state owned the island, which was won by Delaware. Construction then began in 1848 on the current fort, with an irregular pentagon design about the size of the previous star fort. The fort was substantially complete by 1860. During the American Civil War, Fort Delaware was used by the Union as a camp for Confederate prisoners, in particular ones captured at the 1863 Battle of Gettysburg. Many of the prisoners and some guards who died at the fort are buried at nearby Finns Point National Cemetery in New Jersey. Around the turn of the century, a large battery for three then-modern 12-inch guns on disappearing carriages was built in the fort as part of the Endicott program, with batteries for smaller guns elsewhere on the island. On the shores flanking the island, Fort DuPont and Fort Mott were built with modern weapons, and preparations were made to lay underwater minefields in the river. The defenses around Pea Patch Island were disarmed during World War II, as Fort Miles at the mouth of the Delaware estuary superseded them. In the early 20th century, the U.S. Army Corps of Engineers dredged a channel around the island, using the infill to double the island's size on its northern end.

The island is publicly accessible by ferry from both the Delaware and New Jersey banks. In addition to the historic features of the state park, the island provides a significant wetlands stop for migratory birds along the Atlantic Flyway. It is the location of the largest colony of herons in the U.S. north of Florida.

See also
Reedy Island

References

External links
Fort Delaware State Park (official website)
Online tour of Fort Delaware emphasizing Civil War history
 Fort Delaware Sea Wall Photographs, Written Historical and Descriptive Data — Historic American Engineering Record
 Pea Patch Island Seawall Restoration Project — AP Construction

Islands of Delaware
Landforms of New Castle County, Delaware
Delaware in the American Civil War
Protected areas of New Castle County, Delaware
Islands of the Delaware River
Uninhabited islands of the United States